51st–53rd Street (Hyde Park) is a commuter rail station within the City of Chicago serves the Metra Electric Line north to Millennium Station and south to University Park, Blue Island, and South Chicago. As of 2018, the station is the 78th busiest of Metra's 236 non-downtown stations, with an average of 671 weekday boardings. The station location, one of the oldest in the United States, has been in continuous use by commuters since 1856.

During peak commute hours, many express trains stop at this station. At off-peak hours, it is served mainly by local trains. Station entrances are located at E. Hyde Park Boulevard (5100 S.)/Lake Park Avenue and at 53rd Street/Lake Park Avenue. The station is located near Kenwood Academy High School, the 53rd Street commercial district, and the Regents Park apartment complex.

The East Hyde Park Boulevard (51st Street) viaduct was once the site of a graffiti mural, painted by non-profit youth organization Higher Gliffs with Metra's permission. In September 2006, the murals were whitewashed, possibly by mistake.

The station was served by Illinois Central Railroad intercity-trains from Chicago to points south at an island platform on the two non-electrified tracks east of the electrified tracks. Amtrak's City of New Orleans, Illini, and Saluki still pass by the station without stopping. Prior to October 16, 1966, the South Shore Line also stopped at this station. On that date trains ceased calling at 53rd and instead began stopping at 57th Street, the next station south.

Bus connections
CTA
  2 Hyde Park Express 
  6 Jackson Park Express 
  15 Jeffery Local 
  28 Stony Island 
  171 University of Chicago/Hyde Park 
  172 University of Chicago/Kenwood

See also
 Paul Cornell

References

External links

Hyde Park Boulevard entrance from Google Maps Street View

Former Illinois Central Railroad stations
Metra stations in Chicago
Former South Shore Line stations
Railway stations in the United States opened in 1856